ETF Ride Systems is a Dutch manufacturer of amusement ride systems. It was founded in 1999 and is owned by the ETF Group. The company has manufactured both tracked and trackless systems for both dark and outdoor rides.

History
ETF Ride Systems was founded in 1999 as a subsidiary of the ETF Group. The ETF Group currently encompasses ETF Machinefabriek, Sioux Electronics, ETF USA Corporation, and ETF Ride Systems.

One of the company's first projects was to create a dark ride system for Sally Corporation's Labyrinth of the Minotaur ride. It opened in 2000 at the Terra Mítica amusement park in Spain. The ride system consists of several vehicles featuring laser blasters moving along a trackless system. Although this tracked dark ride system was used on other rides, the company has also developed a trackless dark ride system to expand on their offerings.

In 2010, ETF Ride Systems began designing a new ride system for Europa-Park in Germany. Following nine months of design and construction, Da Vinci Flight opened in August 2011. The ride system consists of several vehicles suspended from an overhead monorail line with guests controlling the speed of the ride through the use of on-board pedals.

Products
 Multi Mover – dark ride systems which can be either tracked or trackless and optionally feature a motion platform
 Mystic Mover – similar to the trackless version of the Multi Mover but features smaller cars
Xperience Mover – has the ability to move 360° in all directions with ride media, can be track bound or trackless.
 Panorama Pedal – an indoor/outdoor ride system which allows riders to pedal to control the speed of the motorized vehicle
 Suspended Flight – vehicles are suspended from an overhead monorail line with an operation similar to the Panorama Pedal

The company also has several concepts for rides which they have yet to construct.

Installations

References

External links
 

Amusement ride manufacturers
Manufacturing companies established in 1999
 
Manufacturing companies of the Netherlands
Companies based in Limburg (Netherlands)
Nederweert
1999 establishments in the Netherlands